This is the list of hospitals in Kuwait.

Public Hospitals
Al Razi Hospital
Al Sabah Hospital
Amiri Hospital
Adan Hospital
Mubarak Al-Kabeer Hospital
Farwaniya Hospital
Jahra Hospital
Ibn Sina hospital (neurology, neurophysiology, Epilepsy Monitoring Unit, neurosurgery and pediatric surgery)
Babtain burn center
Hamad organ transplant center
Nefesi nephrology center
NBK Children Hospital
Al Bahar ophthalmology center
Kuwait Cancer Control Center (KCCC)
Military hospital
Al Ahmadi Hospital (For oil companies patients)
Zain ENT Hospital
Shaikh Salem Al-Ali Audiology Center
Chest Diseases Hospital
Maternity Hospital
Psychiatry hospital 
Al-Rashed Allergy center
Islamic medical center
Asad Al-Hamad Skin Center
Sabah Al Ahmad Urology Center
Pulmonary rehabilitation center
Kuwait heart center
Sheikh Jaber Al-Ahmad Hospital

References

Kuwait
Hospitals

Kuwait